Lonzo Nzekwe  is a Toronto, Canada-based filmmaker. He creates transnational Nigerian content, including Anchor Baby, his 2010 debut film which became the first Nollywood film available on iTunes. Anchor Baby was released on Netflix on May 20, 2020. His second film, Meet The Parents won the award for "Best Short Film" at the 2016 Africa Movies Academy Awards (AMAA 2016). Nzekwe is a self-taught writer/director filmmaker. He co-founded the first black-owned 24-hour Canadian television network, FEVA TV, and served as the company's CEO from 2013-2015. He is also actively involved in the distribution of content as well as its creation through his film production/streaming company, Ironflix.

Early life and education 
Nzekwe left Nigeria in 1997, traveling between the United States, Canada and England. He has a Master Course diploma certificate in Recording Engineering from Audio Institute of America. He has a CompTia A+ certification from CompTia. He also has Apple Final Cut Pro, Logic Pro, and Motion certifications from Witz Education in Toronto, Canada.

See also
 List of Nigerian film producers

References 

Living people
Nigerian film directors
Year of birth missing (living people)
Nigerian chief executives
Igbo people
Nigerian film producers